John Stanhope may refer to:

John Stanhope, 1st Baron Stanhope (1545?–1621), English courtier and politician
Sir John Stanhope (1559–1611), English landowner
John Stanhope (MP) (1705–1748), British politician
John Stanhope Collings-Wells (1880–1918), British recipient of the Victoria Cross
John Spencer Stanhope (1787–1873), English landowner and antiquarian
John Roddam Spencer Stanhope (1829–1908), English artist, son of John Spencer Stanhope
Rear Admiral John Stanhope (1744-1800) Royal Navy commander
Jon Stanhope (born 1951), Australian politician